Ahmed Al-Moamari Bashir (born 21 December 1972) is an Omani sprinter. He competed in the men's 100 metres at the 1992 Summer Olympics.

References

External links
 

1972 births
Living people
Athletes (track and field) at the 1992 Summer Olympics
Omani male sprinters
Olympic athletes of Oman
Place of birth missing (living people)
Asian Games medalists in athletics (track and field)
Asian Games bronze medalists for Oman
Athletes (track and field) at the 1998 Asian Games
Athletes (track and field) at the 2002 Asian Games
Medalists at the 1998 Asian Games